Lodipur is a small village in Tekari subdivision of Gaya District in the state of Bihar, India. It is about 6 km from Tekari, located on a state highway.

References

Villages in Gaya district